Liz Maw may refer to:

 Liz Maw (1966), New Zealand artist
 Liz Maw, CEO of Net Impact